Caliscelidae is a family of planthoppers, sap-sucking insects that belong to the order Hemiptera, suborder Auchenorrhyncha and superfamily Fulgoroidea. They are somewhat anomalous and have often been included within the family Issidae. Studies made in 2013 of the phylogeny of the Issidae and other groups using molecular techniques support the treatment of the group as a separate family. Sexual dimorphism can be marked. Some members of the family are called piglet bugs due to the shape of their snout. A particularly aberrant genus described in 2011 from India, Formiscurra, has males that resemble ants.

Subfamilies and tribes
 Caliscelinae Amyot & Audinet-Serville, 1843
 Caliscelini Amyot & Audinet-Serville, 1843
 Afronaso Jacobi, 1910
 Ahomocnemiella Kusnezov, 1929
 Annamatissus Gnezdilov & Bourgoin, 2014
 Asarcopus Horváth, 1921
 Bambusicaliscelis Chen & Zhang, 2011
 Bolbonaso Emeljanov, 2007
 Bruchoscelis Melichar, 1906
 Calampocus Gnezdilov & Bourgoin, 2009
 Caliscelis De Laporte, 1833
 Chirodisca Emeljanov, 1996
 Formiscurra Gnezdilov & Viraktamath, 2011
 Gelastissus Kirkaldy, 1906
 Griphissus Fennah, 1967
 Gwurra Linnavuori, 1973
 Homocnemia Costa, 1857
 Issopulex China & Fennah, 1960
 Madaceratops Gnezdilov, 2011
 Myrmissus Linnavuori, 1973
 Nenasa Chan & Yang, 1994
 Nubianus Gnezdilov & Bourgoin, 2009
 Ordalonema Dlabola, 1980
 Patamadaga Gnezdilov & Bourgoin, 2009
 Populonia Jacobi, 1910
 Reinhardema Gnezdilov, 2010
 Rhinogaster Fennah, 1949
 Rhinoploeus Gnezdilov & Bourgoin, 2009
 Savanopulex Dlabola, 1987
 Sphenax Gnezdilov & Bourgoin, 2009
 Thaiscelis Gnezdilov, 2015
 Ugandana Metcalf, 1952
 Peltonotellini Emeljanov, 2008
 Acromega Emeljanov, 1996
 Aphelonema Uhler, 1876
 Bergrothora Metcalf, 1952
 Bruchomorpha Newman, 1838
 Ceragra Emeljanov, 1996
 Concepcionella Schmidt, 1927
 Fitchiella Van Duzee, 1917
 Homaloplasis Melichar, 1906
 Itatiayana Metcalf, 1952
 Nenema Emeljanov, 1996
 Ohausiella Schmidt, 1910
 Papagona Ball, 1935
 Paranaso Schmidt, 1932
 Peltonotellus Puton, 1886
 Peripola Melichar, 1907
 Plagiopsis Berg, 1883
 Plagiopsola Schmidt, 1927
 Semiperipola Schmidt, 1910
 Ommatidiotinae Fieber, 1875
 Adenissini Dlabola, 1980
 Adenissina Dlabola, 1980
 Bocrina Emeljanov, 1999
 Coinquendina Gnezdilov & Wilson, 2006
 Pteriliina Gnezdilov & Wilson, 2006
 Augilini Baker, 1915
 Anthracidium Emeljanov, 2013
 Augila Stål, 1870
 Augilina Melichar, 1914
 Augilodes Fennah, 1963
 Campures Gnezdilov, 2015
 Cano Gnezdilov, 2011
 Cicimora Emeljanov, 1998
 Discote Emeljanov, 2013
 Pseudosymplanella Che, Zhang & Webb, 2009
 †Quizqueiplana Bourgoin & Wang, 2015
 Signoreta Gnezdilov & Bourgoin, 2009
 Symplana Kirby, 1891
 Symplanella Fennah, 1987
 Symplanodes Fennah, 1987
 Tubilustrium Distant, 1916
 Ommatidiotini Fieber, 1875
 Ommatidiotus Spinola, 1839
incertae sedis
Peltonotellus Kusnezov, 1930

References

 
Auchenorrhyncha families
Fulgoromorpha